Aluminium Al-Mahdi Hormozgan Volleyball Club  is an Iranian professional volleyball team based in Bandar Abbas, Iran. The club has a policy of having at least 50% of the squad members from the province of Hormozgan.

History
Aluminium Hormozgan Volleyball Club was established in 2006 under the guidance of the Aluminium Hormozgan Company. Soon after its establishment Aluminium became champions of Hormozgan and were promoted to the 3rd Division, but they bought the licence of another club and were placed in the 1st Division. After a short while Aluminium was promoted to the Iranian Super League.

Team Rosters

2015/2016

Heach coach:  Nasser Shahnazi
Assistant coach:  Abdolraouf Bastegani
Manager:  Sedigh Salehizadeh

References

External links
  Rosters
  Sport in Hormozgan

Iranian volleyball clubs